Oğuzhan Çapar (born 8 October 1996) is a Turkish football player who plays as a defender for Ankaraspor in the TFF Second League.

Professional career
Çapar made his professional debut with Kayserispor in a 2–0 Turkish Cup loss to Fenerbahçe on 21 January 2020.

References

External links
 
 
 Mackolik Profile

1996 births
Sportspeople from Balıkesir
Living people
Turkish footballers
Turkey youth international footballers
Association football defenders
Balıkesirspor footballers
Kayserispor footballers
Menemenspor footballers
Ankaraspor footballers
Süper Lig players
TFF First League players
TFF Second League players